The 1919 Saxe-Altenburg state election was held on 26 January 1919 to elect the 40 members of the Landtag of Saxe-Altenburg.

Results

References 

Saxe-Altenburg
Elections in Thuringia